United Nations Security Council Resolution 146, adopted on August 9, 1960, after a report by the Secretary-General regarding the implementation of resolutions 143 and 145 the Council confirmed his authority to carry out the responsibility placed on him thereby and called upon Belgium to withdraw its troops from Katanga.  The Council then, while reaffirming that the United Nations Force in the Congo would not be a party to or in any way intervene in any internal conflict, declared that the entry of UN Forces into Katanga was necessary for the full implementation of the present resolution.

The resolution was approved by nine votes; France and Italy abstained.

See also
List of United Nations Security Council Resolutions 101 to 200 (1953–1965)
Resolutions 143, 145, 157, 161 and 169
The Congo Crisis

Citations

References

External links 
 
Text of the Resolution at undocs.org

 0146
 0146
 0146
1960 in the Republic of the Congo (Léopoldville)
1960 in Belgium
Congo Crisis
State of Katanga
August 1960 events